José de la Rosa was a Mexican composer, printer, singer and guitarist who moved to Mexican Alta California in 1833, with the Híjar-Padrés Party, where he became known as Don Pepe. He may have also been the first professional printer in California history.

Rosa was an Alcalde of the Presidio of Sonoma. He played a role in the 1846 Bear Flag rebellion in Sonoma, when he assisted in assuring the release of Mariano Vallejo.

Californio music
Rosa documented the oldest-known transcriptions of Mexican-Californian Californios song lyrics, in a notebook now archived in the Southwest Museum of the American Indian in Los Angeles.

See also

References

Notes

Californios
Mexican guitarists
Mexican male guitarists
Mexican male composers
Mexican people of the Bear Flag Revolt
People of the Conquest of California
19th-century Mexican people
Year of birth missing
Year of death missing